Herman Sergo (1 October 1911 Jausa, Käina Parish, Hiiu County – 28 September 1989) was an Estonian writer. His works depict mainly the life of seafarers and coastal dwellers.

Until 1932, he worked as a sailor on Swedish and Finnish long-distance vessels. Until 1955, he worked at several maritime-related positions. Since 1955, he was a professional writer.

His most notable work is historical trilogy "Näkimadalad" ('Mermaid Shallows'). 1978–1988, Estonian Television did 4-part mini-series "Näkimadalad". The series were directed by Olav Neuland.

Works
 novel "Meri kutsub" (1960)
 novel "Pinnavirvendus ja põhjalained" (1962)
 novel "Kajakalaid" (1963)
 novel "Põgenike laev" (1966)
 novel "Vihavald" (1970)
 novel "Kodusadam" (1982)
 novel "Näkimadalad" I–III (1984)
 novel "Randröövel" (1988)
 novel "Rukkirahu" (1988)

References

1911 births
1989 deaths
Estonian male novelists
20th-century Estonian writers
People from Hiiumaa Parish
Soviet writers